The Art of the Trio Volume One is an album by American pianist and composer Brad Mehldau released on the Warner Bros. label in 1997.

Reception

AllMusic awarded the album 3 stars and in its review by Scott Yanow stated: "At this point in time, pianist Brad Mehldau's style falls between Keith Jarrett and Bill Evans, being heavily influenced by the voicings of the latter and the free yet lyrical improvising of the former." The Penguin Guide to Jazz Recordings has listed the album as one of its "Core Collection" for fans of jazz music.

Track listing 
All compositions by Brad Mehldau except as indicated
 "Blame It on My Youth" (Edward Heyman, Oscar Levant) – 6:17
 "I Didn't Know What Time It Was" (Lorenz Hart, Richard Rodgers) – 6:30
 "Ron's Place" – 6:29
 "Blackbird" (John Lennon, Paul McCartney) – 5:00
 "Lament for Linus" – 4:38
 "Mignon's Song" – 6:34
 "I Fall in Love Too Easily" (Sammy Cahn, Jule Styne) – 7:16
 "Lucid" – 5:43
 "Nobody Else but Me" (Oscar Hammerstein II, Jerome Kern) – 7:36

Personnel 
Brad Mehldau – piano
Larry Grenadier – bass
Jorge Rossy – drums

Credits 
Produced by Matt Pierson
Engineered by James Farber
Mastering by Greg Calbi
Art direction and design by Rey International
Production coordination by Dana Watson
Photography by Andrea Marouk
Band photographs by Ed Fox

References 

1997 albums
Albums produced by Matt Pierson
Brad Mehldau albums
Warner Records albums